de Quesada is a Spanish surname.  Individuals with this surname include:

 Alfredo De Quesada (b. 1976) - actor of Cuban heritage born in Puerto Rico
 Ernesto de Quesada (b. 1886 - d.195?) - Cuban-born impresario, primarily in Europe and Latin America
 Gonzalo de Quesada y Aróstegui (1868–1915) - figure in the Cuban Independence Movement with José Martí
 Gonzalo Jiménez de Quesada (1509–1579) - conquistador in Colombia
 Hernán Pérez de Quesada - conquistador, brother of Gonzalo Jiménez de Quesada
 Ricardo Alarcón de Quesada (b. 1937) - president of National Assembly of People's Power of Cuba as of 1993

See also
 Quesada (disambiguation)